Jacopo Galimberti (born 15 June 1993) is an Italian professional footballer who plays as a defender for ASD Pontelambrese.

Career
Born in Carate Brianza, Lombardy, Galimberti started his career at Internazionale. He had played for Inter since 2001–02 season (in Pulcini B2 team); he played every level in the youth system: Pulcini A in 2003–04 to Esordienti in 2004–05. Since 2005–06 season had played in youth competitive leagues: Lombard Giovanissimi (2005–06 for B team, 2006–07 for A team), National Giovanissimi (2007–08), Lombard Allievi (2008–09), National Allievi (2009–10) and Primavera (2010–12).

Despite not a regular for Inter's Primavera team, in January 2012 he was sold to Parma in co-ownership deal along with Diego Mella for €500,000 each, but Parma only paid Inter by selling Yao Eloge Koffi for a tagged price €1 million also in co-ownership deal. Both clubs registered a player profit of nearly €2 million in the swap deal but only in terms of increase in intangible asset (asset value of the player contract "increased").

Galimberti spent had season with Parma's Primavera team before moved to his first professional team Gubbio on 23 July.

In June 2013 Inter bought back Galimberti and Mella for €1.85 million in a two-year contract; co-currently Nwankwo Obiora joined Parma outright, for €100,000.

On 24 July 2013, Galimberti joined A.C. Monza Brianza 1912 in temporary deal, which the club represents both city of Monza and Brianza region where Galimberti was born.

On 1 August 2014, Savona signed Galimberti and Matteo Colombi from Inter in a temporary deal.

In June 2017, Galimberti joined USD CasateseRogoredo. In December 2017 he then joined FBC Saronno, before joining ASD Pontelambrese in July 2018.

Footnotes

References

External links
 Football.it profile 

1993 births
Living people
People from Carate Brianza
Association football defenders
Italian footballers
Inter Milan players
Parma Calcio 1913 players
A.S. Gubbio 1910 players
A.C. Monza players
Savona F.B.C. players
S.S.D. Pro Sesto players
Serie C players
Serie D players
Footballers from Lombardy
Sportspeople from the Province of Monza e Brianza